This article provides a listing (with simple descriptions, where possible) of the streets in the New York City borough of Brooklyn, including Fort Hamilton, the last active-duty military post in New York City.

State-named roadways

Avenues

Numbered Avenues
Apart from the portion of 3rd through 7th Avenues beyond 86th Street, the numbered avenues run approximately 40 degrees west of south, but by local custom are called North–south.

Boulevards

Courts

Lanes

Loops

Parkways

Places

Roads

Streets

Named streets

Named streets in Greenpoint
The east–west streets in Greenpoint are in mostly alphabetical order from north to south.  Originally, these streets were simply given lettered names such as "A Street" and "B Street", but in the mid-19th century, the streets were given longer names. This system persists today with a few exceptions: Ash, Box, Clay, Dupont, Eagle, Freeman, Greene, Huron, India, Java, Kent, Greenpoint Avenue (formerly Lincoln Street), Milton, Noble, Oak, and Quay streets. Greenpoint Avenue was formerly named Lincoln Street. There would have been a street starting with the letter "P" between Oak and Quay Streets, but it was named Calyer Street early in Greenpoint's history, after the patriarch of a nearby family.

Directionally numbered streets

North Streets
The following chart lists and describes the numbered streets directionally labeled 'North', delineated by Grand Street in Williamsburg.

South Streets
The following chart lists and describes the numbered streets directionally labeled "South", delineated by Grand Street in Williamsburg.

West Streets
There are streets which are designated as "West #" Street. These streets are oriented north-south and lie west of Dahill Road/West Street (Gravesend). There are two streets named West 9th Street: one in Carroll Gardens and Red Hook west of 9th Street, and the other in Gravesend and Coney Island between West 8th and West 10th Streets. Only the West 9th Street in Coney Island is part of the overall "West Street" numbering system.

East Streets
There are also streets which are designated as 'East X' Street. They run from East 1st Street to East 108th Street. These streets are oriented north-south and generally lie east of Dahill Road/West Street (Gravesend) which forms the western edge of the old town of Flatbush. Many of the "east" streets extend into Prospect Lefferts Gardens.

Brooklyn has no "East" streets with the following numbers:
 East 20th Street (replaced by Ocean Avenue)
 East 25th Street (replaced by Bedford Avenue)
 East 30th Street (replaced by Nostrand Avenue)
 Note: In Marine Park, Marine Parkway diverges from Nostrand Avenue. East 31st Street is located east of Marine Parkway, but East 29th Street is located west of Nostrand Avenue. As a result, several named streets separate Nostrand Avenue and Marine Parkway.
East 33rd Street (replaced by New York Avenue except below Flatlands Avenue in Marine Park where East 33rd Street exists.
 East 41st Street in Flatlands (mostly replaced by Albany Avenue)
 East 44th Street (replaced by Troy Avenue)
 East 47th Street (replaced by Schenectady Avenue)
 East 50th Street (replaced by Utica Avenue)
 East 62nd Street (replaced by Mill Avenue)
 East 75th Street (does not exist in the grid)
 East 90th Street (replaced by Remsen Avenue)
 East 97th Street (replaced by Rockaway Parkway)

Some of the "East Streets" do nominally exist, but for the most part, are replaced by named roads. These include:
 East 1st Street in Brighton Beach (mostly replaced by McDonald Avenue)
 East 6th Street in Brighton Beach (mostly replaced by Ocean Parkway)
 East 11th Street in Brighton Beach (mostly replaced by Coney Island Avenue)
 East 60th Street in Mill Basin (mostly replaced by Ralph Avenue)

Other numbered streets

Bay Streets

There are 28 "Bay Streets" in Bath Beach numbered Bay 7th Street through Bay 50th Street. Every third street (Bay 9th Street, Bay 12th Street, etc.) does not exist, and a numbered avenue takes its place. Most of them run between 86th Street and Belt Parkway.

Brighton Streets
There are 16 "Brighton Streets" in Brighton Beach, although Brighton 1st and Brighton 9th Street do not exist, while Brighton 1st Road, Brighton 1st Place, and Brighton 8th Court do.

West Brighton Avenue leads to Brighton Beach Avenue at the intersection of Ocean Parkway. After, the streets begin numerically, beginning at Brighton 1st Road, Brighton 1st Place, Brighton 2nd Street, Brighton 3rd Street, Brighton 4th Street, Brighton 5th Street, Brighton 6th Street, Brighton 7th Street before hitting Coney Island Avenue, which runs perpendicular. Then, Brighton 8th Street, Brighton 8th Court, Brighton 10th Street (which has a small cul-de-sac of small side streets named Brighton 10th Court, Brighton 10th Path, Brighton Terrace, and Brighton 10th Lane), Brighton 11th Street, Brighton 12th Street, Brighton 13th Street, Brighton 14th Street, Brighton 15th Street, ending at Corbin Place, where Manhattan Beach begins.

Flatlands Streets
There are 10 "Flatlands Streets" in eastern Canarsie. Unlike the Bay Streets, they alternate with the lettered Avenues (e.g. Flatlands 3rd Street is not replaced by Avenue K, etc.) Each street is one block long.

Paerdegat Streets
There are 15 streets, numbered Paerdegat 1st Street through Paerdegat 15th Street, in Paerdegat, Brooklyn. They each run one block between Paerdegat Avenue North (East 76th Street) and East 80th Street.

Plumb Streets
There are three streets, Plumb 1st Street and Plumb 2nd Street, in the Plumb Beach section of Brooklyn. These streets are both very short, with Plumb 1st Street being 3 blocks long and Plumb 2nd and 3rd Street being 2 blocks long.

Terraces

Other

Fort Hamilton
The following thoroughfares are located inside Fort Hamilton, the last active-duty military post in New York City, and are under federal jurisdiction: Roosevelt Avenue, Schum Avenue, Walke Avenue, 
Warren Avenue (formerly General Lee Avenue), White Avenue (also N. White Avenue), Marshall Drive, Sterling Drive, Stonewall Jackson Drive, Wainwright Drive, Washington Drive, Pershing Loop North/South, Sheridan Loop, Grimes Road, MacArthur (or Macarthur) Road, Schum Road, Washington Road, Pence Street (partially), and 101st Street (partially).

References

 
Brooklyn
Brooklyn